Mathias Grassow is a German ambient musician whose recordings can also be classified in the genres of
dark ambient and drone ambient. His music often has a meditative and emotional and spiritual context, which induces deep feelings of introspection in listeners. Over his long career, he has collaborated extensively with other notable ambient composers such as Klaus Wiese, Oöphoi, Alio Die, and Tomas Weiss.

Origins

Mathias Grassow played drums and guitar in the 1970s and moved on to keyboards in the early 1980s. Later, he became interested in keyboards and electronic synths. He had an interest in Alan Watts books and spirituality. His interests progressed over from Buddhism to Sufism and to the mystical side of Christianity. He became interested in overtone and subharmonic chants, long deep synthesizer drones, and in Indian classical music. Later he was influenced by the singing bowl sound recordings of Klaus Wiese.

Discography

Notable albums include the following:

 1991, Prophecy
 1993, In Search Of Sanity
 1997, Namakar
 1998, Elixir
 1998, Himavat
 1999, Dissolution
 1999, Himalaya
 2000, Cosmic Chasm
 2000, The Fragrance Of Eternal Roses
 2006, Dronament
 2006, Opus Posthumum
 2007, Deeper Purity
 2009, Calibration

Notes

External links
Mathias Grassow official Web site

Living people
Ambient musicians
Dark ambient musicians
German male musicians
Year of birth missing (living people)